Langar cum Barnstone is a civil parish in the Rushcliffe borough, within the county of Nottinghamshire, England. The overall area had a population of 980 at the 2011 census. The parish lies near the county border with Leicestershire. It lies 120 miles north of London, 4 miles south east of Bingham and 12 miles south east from the city of Nottingham.

Geography

Settlements 
The parish consists of two settlements:

 Langar
 Barnstone

Langar 

Langar is based in the western top of the parish. It is clustered around a square layout of roads, with a notable church and estate hall.

Barnstone 

This is ½ mile north east of Langar. It is a linear settlement based along Main Road.

Predominantly, most of the residents are clustered around the villages. Outside of these is a scattering of farms, farmhouses and cottages amongst a wider rural setting, with some industry.

Land elevation 
The parish is very low-lying, being in the Vale of Belvoir.

Geology 
The area has some red marl, but principally is upon lias limestone. This accounts for several quarries and pits developed over the years located throughout the parish.

Water features 
Three watercourses run through the area:

 Stroom Dyke, south of Langar
 Rundle Beck, in the southern right corner of the parish, this flows into the:
 River Whipling, forming the north east corner of the boundary.

These all are tributaries of the River Smite which is beyond the north boundary of the parish.

Religious sites

St Andrew's Church, Langar

Built in the 13th century, this Church of England chapel is often called the "Cathedral of the Vale" for its size relative to Langar village. This may have come about in part through its importance as a place of pilgrimage in Saxon times. It was restored extensively in the 19th century.

St Mary's Church, Barnstone

This was built 1855-1857 and was the successor of or nearby to an earlier medieval church. It was closed as a site of worship in 2017.

Landmarks

Langar airfield 

A standout land feature, this was a former RAF base before being decommissioned and used for light civil aviation purposes to this day.

Langar Hall

Built in 1837 on the site of an earlier manor house, the present Hall was constructed by John Marriott who was a local farmer. It was bought by Annie Bayley in 1860 and has remained in the family ever since. The Hall was converted to a hotel in 1983.

Listed buildings
Over 20 local structures are listed, including the church dedicated to St. Andrew at Langar, the former St. Mary chapel of ease at Barnstone, Langar Hall, and a war memorial.

Industry 
The parish has several areas catering to light to medium sized industry, some of which contain auxiliary buildings and hangars reused after the air base decommissioning:

 Langar Industrial Estate
 Barnstone Works for processing lime/gypsum
 John Deere

References

External links 

 Langar & Barnstone Parish Council

Civil parishes in Nottinghamshire
Rushcliffe